The Association for Materials Protection and Performance (AMPP), is a professional association focused on the protection of assets and performance of materials. AMPP was created when NACE International and SSPC the Society for Protective Coatings merged in 2021. AMPP is active in more than 130 countries and has more than 40,000 members. AMPP is headquartered in the U.S. with offices in Houston, Texas and Pittsburgh, Pennsylvania. Additional offices are located in the U.K., China, Malaysia, Brazil, and Saudi Arabia with a training center in Dubai.

Publications
Materials Performance magazine
CoatingsPro magazine
CORROSION journal
technical and reference books
podcasts and webcasts

Standards
Both the legacy NACE and SSPC organizations were ANSI-accredited standards developers, which AMPP plans to continue. The merged standards program includes 25 standing standards committees that develop technical standards for industries including cathodic protection, coatings, defense, highways and bridges, rail, maritime, oil and gas, power and utilities, research and testing, tanks and pipelines, and water and wastewater.

Professional Training and Certifications
AMPP offers individual training and certification programs. Many are merged programs that originated as competing programs under the former NACE and SSPC organizations. Other programs are still being administered under the legacy NACE or SSPC frameworks until the merger is complete.

Contractor Accreditation
AMPP administers accreditation programs for contractors working in the protective coatings and linings industries. "QP" stands for "Qualification Procedure", a reference to the technical standard that underlies each program.

QP 1, Field Application to Complex Industrial and Marine Structures
QP 2, Field Removal of Hazardous Coatings
QP 3, Shop Painting (QP 3 is a joint standard also used by AISC for their sophisticated paint endorsement.)
QP 5, Coating and Lining Inspection Companies
QP 6, Metallizing
QP 7, Painting Contractor Introductory Program
QP 8, Installation of Polymer Coatings and Surfacings on Concrete and Other Cementitious Surfaces
QP 9, Commercial Painting and Coating Contractors
QN 1, Nuclear Coating Supplement
QS 1, Advanced Quality Management System (ISO 9001-compliant)

Conferences
AMPP Annual Conference
Area Conferences
Coatings+ (will retire after 2021)
CORROSION (will retire after 2022)

External links
AMPP Website
SSPC: The Society for Protective Coatings Website
NACE International Website

References

Professional associations based in the United States
Organizations established in 2021
Corrosion
Engineering societies